Hofkirche is the German language word for "court church", and may refer to:

Dresden
Catholic
 Former Opernhaus am Taschenberg (Opera theatre at the Taschenberg, opened in 1667), changed to a Catholic Hofkirche, dedicated in 1708
 Dresden Cathedral, built 1739 to 1751, replacing the former as Hofkirche
Lutheran
 Sophienkirche, Protestant Hofkirche from 1737

Other cities
 Allerheiligen-Hofkirche, the All Saints' Court Church, Munich, Germany
 Hofkirche, Innsbruck, Austria
 Hofkirche, Lucerne, Switzerland

See also 
 Hofkirchen (disambiguation)

